Tiziano Ferro (born 21 February 1980) is an Italian singer, songwriter, producer and author. He broke through in 2001 with his international hit single "Perdono" and has remained commercially successful since then, in several countries. Ferro has released a Spanish version of each of his albums and has also sung in English, Portuguese, and French. Known as the modern face of Italian pop music, he frequently writes songs for other artists and has produced albums for Giusy Ferreri, Alessandra Amoroso and Baby K.

Aside from his success as an artist, Ferro is well known for his personal struggles. Having been overweight as a teenager, he has been outspoken about his battles with food addiction and eating disorders. In October 2010, at the height of his fame, Ferro came out as gay, having himself struggled with depression related to self-acceptance about his homosexuality.

Ferro is currently one of the best-selling artists in Italy. Both his third album Nessuno è solo and fourth album Alla mia età were certified diamond. Despite his fears, his coming out did not negatively affect his career, as his fifth album L'amore è una cosa semplice was the best-selling album of 2012 in Italy, and his first greatest hits album was supported by a stadium tour. As of 2015, Ferro has sold over 15 million records worldwide.

Biography

Childhood and early beginnings
Ferro's interest in music was born when he received a toy keyboard as a present, which was used to compose his first songs when he was seven. He later started taking guitar and piano classes at a local conservatory of music. When he was 16 years old, he joined a gospel choir and during the same years, he started performing in piano bars and karaoke contests.

In 1997, Ferro participated in the "Accademia della Canzone di Sanremo", a music contest created with the purpose to choose the contestants for the Sanremo Music Festival, but was eliminated during the first stage of the competition. The following year, Ferro participated again in the same contest, and despite being chosen as one of the 12 finalists, he did not make it to win the competition. However, during the selections, Ferro met music producers Alberto Salerno and Mara Maionchi, and started to collaborate with them.

In 1999 Ferro also toured throughout Italy as a back vocalist with the Italian hip hop band Sottotono.

Career breakthrough
In 2001, Ferro signed a contract with EMI Music Italy. On 22 June 2001, he released his first single, "Xdono". During the first months after the release, the song received a poor reception, but it later became a hit and, after topping the Italian Singles Chart in September 2001, it was certified double platinum by the Federation of the Italian Music Industry for sales exceeding 100,000 copies.

The song was included in Ferro's debut album, Rosso Relativo, released on 26 October 2001. Following the commercial success obtained in Italy, in 2002 the album was released in several European countries. A Spanish-language version of the record, titled Rojo Relativo, was also released in Spain and Latin America. Rosso Relativo obtained success in different markets throughout its various editions and had sold more than 1,000,000 copies worldwide by 2004, according to EMI Music. The album also allowed Ferro to receive a nomination for Best New Artist at the Latin Grammy Awards of 2003.

Second studio album, 111
In November 2003, Ferro released his second studio album, 111, recorded both in Italian and Spanish, produced by Alberto Salerno, Mara Maionchi and Michele Canova. The album was preceded by the release of "Xverso" / "Perverso", and also spawned the singles "Sere nere" / "Tardes negras", "Non me lo so spiegare" / "No me lo puedo explicar" and "Ti voglio bene" / "Desde mañana no lo sé". 111 has sold more than 1,000,000 copies worldwide, topping the Mexican Albums Chart and being certified four times platinum in Italy for domestic sales exceeding 450,000 copies. Following the success of the album Ferro won Best Italian Artist at the 2004 MTV Europe Music Awards in Rome.

In July 2004, Ferro also released in Europe his first English-language single, "Universal Prayer", a duet with British R&B singer Jamelia recorded to promote the 2004 Olympic Games in Athens, Greece.

Ferro lived in Mexico during these years, first in Cuernavaca and later in Puebla. He studied Spanish there at a university, eventually graduating in August 2005, before relocating to Manchester.

Nessuno è solo / Nadie está solo, the third studio album
Ferro's third studio album, Nessuno è solo / Nadie está solo, was released in June 2006, following the lead single "Stop! Dimentica", which became a number-one hit in Italy and Austria. The album, described by music critics as more intimate and melancholic, obtained in Italy a success even bigger than his previous ones, reaching the diamond certification for its domestic sales. The third single from the album, "Ti scatterò una foto", was included in the soundtrack of the movie Ho voglia di te, directed by Luis Prieto and based on the book with the same title by Federico Moccia. Nessuno è solo also features a duet with Italian pop singer-songwriter Biagio Antonacci, while the Spanish-language version of the album includes "Mi credo", a song recorded with Pepe Aguilar.

Alla mia età / A mi edad
In June 2008 Ferro co-wrote with Roberto Casalino the single "Non ti scordar mai di me" for X Factor Italy's first edition's runner-up Giusy Ferreri. The song became a huge success in Italy, topping the Italian Singles Chart for 12 non-consecutive weeks. Ferro also produced Giusy Ferreri's debut album, Gaetana, containing 6 songs penned by him, including "L'amore e basta!", a duet between Ferro and Ferreri.

On 7 November 2008 Ferro released his fourth studio album, Alla mia età / A mi edad, preceded by the single with the same title. Alla mia età debuted at number one on the Italian Albums Chart and became the best-selling album of 2009 in Italy, also achieving his second diamond certification. The album contains a duet with singer-songwriter Franco Battiato, and "Breathe Gentle", the English version of third single "Indietro", features Kelly Rowland. Other collaborators to the project included Italian songstress Laura Pausini, Anahí and Dulce María of Mexican pop group RBD and Amaia Montero.

In November 2009, Ferro released his first video album, Alla mia età – Live in Rome, recorded during his concerts at the Stadio Olimpico on 24 and 25 June 2009. A few months later, Ferro was chosen to write and record the Italian version of Mary J. Blige's single "Each Tear", included in her album Stronger with Each Tear The song reached the top spot on the Italian Singles Chart.

L'amore è una cosa semplice / El amor es una cosa simple
In October 2011 Ferro released "La differenza tra me e te", the lead single from his fifth studio album L'amore è una cosa semplice (titled El amor es una cosa simple in Spanish). The album was released on 28 November 2011 and spent five weeks on top of the Italian Albums Chart. All seven singles were certified gold or higher in the country. The album itself was certified eight times platinum and became the best-selling album of 2012.

During the spring and summer of 2012, Ferro embarked on a largely domestic concert tour, with additional stops in Switzerland, Belgium and Monaco. The tour's highlight was Ferro's first full stadium concert at the Stadio Olimpico in Rome. This sold-out concert was attended by 50,000 fans.

In 2012, Ferro wrote the song "Per Te", sung by Andrea Bocelli and contained in the album of the world-famous jazz player Chris Botti, which earned him a Grammy Award for [[Grammy Award for Best Pop Instrumental Album]|Best Pop Instrumental Album]].

In 2013 Ferro opted to focus on collaborating with other artists. Italian female hip hop artist Baby K released her debut album Una seria in March, which was produced by Ferro together with Michele Canova. Ferro featured on first single "Killer", which peaked at No. 10 on the Italian Singles Chart and was certified platinum. He also featured on the album's third single, "Sei sola". In September Alessandra Amoroso released Amore puro, another album produced by Ferro and Canova. This album achieved a double platinum certification. Four of its five singles were written by Ferro.

TZN - The Best of Tiziano Ferro
Ferro released his first greatest hits album TZN - The Best of Tiziano Ferro in November 2014. Both the lead single "Senza scappare mai più" and the second single "Incanto" reached the top five in Italy and were certified platinum. The album itself spent six non-consecutive weeks at number one, the last of which came after his acclaimed guest performance at the Sanremo Music Festival. It was eventually certified seven times platinum and spent almost a year in the top ten on the Italian album chart. In Spain, it was Ferro's first top ten album in more than ten years.

In the summer of 2015 Ferro toured the main Italian stadiums, including two concerts at the San Siro stadium in Milan and two at the Stadio Olimpico in Rome. The Milan concerts were recorded and added to a new CD/DVD edition of TZN - The Best of Tiziano Ferro, that was released in November 2015. That same month Ferro started a European arena tour to continue promoting the greatest hits compilation.

Il mestiere della vita
Ferro announced the release date of his sixth studio album a year in advance, at the last concert of his European arena tour. He told the crowd that it would be released on 2 December 2016. In June the album's title was revealed to be Il mestiere della vita. The album's lead single "Potremmo ritornare" was released in October and debuted on top of the Italian Singles Chart. It was his first number-one hit as lead artist since 2008's "Alla mia età".

Among the collaborators include Baby K, Raige, Emanuele Dabbono, Tormento and Carmen Consoli, the latter collaboration Ferro and Consoli sang together in the second single Il conforto, extracted on January 13, 2017. The song reached the 4th position in the Italian Singles Chart.

Composed of 13 tracks, the album features pop, rap and R&B sounds, with themes ranging from forgiveness to fear and anger.

From June to July 2017 the tour "Il mestiere della vita Tour 2017" was held, consisting of thirteen dates in Italian stadiums. In April 2018 the singer-songwriter won an Onstage Award for the best Italian tour.

In 2018, Ferro collaborated with Ed Sheeran and his brother Matthew on the composition of "Amo solo te"("This Is the Only Time" in the English version). Ferro wrote the lyrics of the song, interpreted by Andrea Bocelli and Ed Sheeran and included in the album Sì.

Accetto miracoli
Accetto miracoli was released in November 2019. The album, certified Double Platinum in Italy, was also released in Spanish language, as Acepto milagros, one week after the Italian release.

Produced by the guru of American R&B sound Timbaland (9 of 12 tracks) and anticipated by two singles, "Buona (Cattiva) Sorte" and the title track "Accept Miracles", it is an album that its author has defined: "fresh, honest, energetic, the result of the need to deliver myself to new experiences".

Accetto Miracoli contains 12 tracks: "Vai ad Amarti", "Amici per errore", "Balla per Me" (a duet with Jovanotti), "In mezzo a questo inverno", "Come farebbe un uomo", "Seconda pelle", "Il destino di chi visse per amare", "Le 3 parole sono 2", "Casa a Natale", "Un Uomo Pop", "Buona (Cattiva) Sorte" and "Accetto Miracoli". Only in digital formats, there are 2 additional bonus tracks, "Accetto Miracoli" and "In mezzo a questo inverno", arranged by the producer Julio Reyes Copello.

In the Spanish version of the album, the tracklist includes a duet on the title track with Ana Guerra. The single went to number 1 on the digital charts in Spain, France, and Benelux.

An Italian tour for Accetto miracoli was originally scheduled for 2020, but was postponed to 2021 due to the COVID-19 pandemic in Italy, and later canceled.

In 2021, Ferro was made part of the voting committee of the American Recording Academy, the organization which bestows Grammy Awards. He is only the second Italian to join the board, after composer and conductor Gabriele Ciampi.

Il mondo è nostro
Ferro's newest album, Il mondo è nostro, is scheduled to be released on 11 November 2022, with an Italian tour set for summer 2023. Ferro released the first single, "La vita splendida", in September 2022. On 30 September 2022, a collaboration between Ferro and Italian rapper Tha Supreme, titled "r()t()onda", was released on Tha Supreme's second studio album c@ra++ere s?ec!@le ("Carattere speciale"), and will also appear on Il mondo è nostro. Ferro's album will also include duets with Sting ("For Her Love"), Roberto Vecchioni ("I miti"), Caparezza ("L'angelo degli altri e di se stesso") and Ambra Angiolini ("Ambra/Tiziano"). Il mondo è nostro debuted at #1 on the Federazione Industria Musicale Italiana (FIMI) Top 100 Albums chart.

Personal life 
Ferro was diagnosed with depression in 2008 and started taking antidepressants. In late 2009, he came close to taking his own life, going as far as to write a suicide note. In early 2010 his desperation led him to break down and came out to his father, an event that inspired the title of his first book, Trent'anni e una chiacchierata con papà (Thirty years old and a chat with dad). This book, published in October 2010, contains most of his personal diaries, dutifully kept since his teenage years. Its release was preceded by an interview with Vanity Fair in which he declared his homosexuality to the public. The following year Ferro moved back to Italy to live closer to his friends and family.

In 2019, Ferro announced his marriage to former Warner Bros. consultant Victor Allen. The two were married in Sabaudia, a comune of the Latina province in Latium. In a statement made to the Corriere, he confirmed that he considers himself both "gay and Catholic". On February 28, 2022, Ferro announced that he and Allen had become fathers to two children, a girl and a boy.

Discography

 Rosso Relativo (2001)
 111 (2003)
 Nessuno è solo (2006)
 Alla mia età (2009)
 L'amore è una cosa semplice (2011)
 Il mestiere della vita (2016)
 Accetto miracoli (2019)
 Il mondo è nostro (2022)

Filmography

Films and television

Tours
 Rosso relativo Tour 2002–2003
 111% Tour 2004–2005
 Nessuno è solo Tour 2007
 Alla mia età Tour 2009–2010
 L'amore è una cosa semplice Tour 2012
 Lo stadio Tour 2015
 Il mestiere della vita Tour 2017

Awards and nominations

References

External links

 
 
 

 
1980 births
Living people
English-language singers from Italy
French-language singers of Italy
Gay singers
Italian gay musicians
Italian male singer-songwriters
Italian operatic baritones
Italian pop singers
Italian record producers
Italian Roman Catholics
LGBT Christians
Italian LGBT singers
Italian LGBT songwriters
Gay songwriters
MTV Europe Music Award winners
People from Latina, Lazio
People of Venetian descent
Portuguese-language singers of Italy
Spanish-language singers of Italy
Universal Music Latin Entertainment artists
World Music Awards winners
21st-century Italian male singers
20th-century Italian LGBT people
21st-century Italian LGBT people
LGBT people in Latin music